Arriga is a rural locality in the Shire of Mareeba, Queensland, Australia. It has Queensland's largest wind farm.

Geography 
The Great Dividing Range passes through the south and east of the locality, with the following mountains within the locality:

 Mount White 
 Walsh Bluff 

The Mareeba Dimbula Road enters the locality from the north-west (Paddys Green) and exits to the west (Mutchilba).

History 
The Tableland Sugar Mill started operation on 28 June 1998. It was the first new sugar mill in Queensland for 75 years and the most technologically advanced making extensive use of automation and being environmentally-friendly.

The Mount Emerald Wind Farm commenced generating wind energy from its 53 wind turbines in August 2019.

Economy 
The Tableland Sugar Mill is located in Arriga.

The Mount Emerald Wind Farm on the Great Dividing Range is in the south of the locality.

The Lotus Glen Correctional Centre is in Chettle Road.

See also 
 List of sugar mills in Queensland

References

External links 

Shire of Mareeba
Localities in Queensland